Working Man: A Tribute to Rush is a tribute album to progressive rock band Rush recorded by various artists and released on Magna Carta Records in 1996 (see 1996 in music). The album was mixed by original Rush producer Terry Brown at Town Music Studios in Toronto, Canada. Mike Portnoy was the main creative consultant.

Personnel
Several prominent musicians from the genres of hard rock, progressive rock, heavy metal, progressive metal and extreme metal were a part of this project. Musicians include Sebastian Bach, Jake E. Lee, Mike Portnoy, Billy Sheehan, Brendt Allman, James LaBrie, Jack Russell, Michael Romeo, Michael Pinnella, Mike Baker, Gary Wehrkamp, Carl Cadden-James, Joe Nevollo, Steve Morse, Kevin Soffera, James Murphy, Eric Martin, Brad Kaiser, Robert Berry, Mark Slaughter, Deen Castronovo, Stuart Hamm, John Petrucci, Matt Guillory, Ray Alder, Joey Vera, Mark Zonder, Jim Matheos, Jason Keaser, Devin Townsend, Sean Malone, Sean Reinert, Gregoor Van Der Loo, Trent Gardner, Jeff Brockman, George Lynch.

Track listing
All songs written by Geddy Lee/Alex Lifeson/Neil Peart, except where noted.

References

External links
 http://www.magnacarta.net/releases/workingman.html
 http://www.progarchives.com/album.asp?id=10666
 http://www.2112.net/powerwindows/covers.html

1996 albums
Magna Carta Records albums
Rush (band) tribute albums